Lawal Yahaya Gumau  (born 26 August 1968) is Nigerian politician who is currently serving as a Senator from Bauchi South Senatorial District. Prior to becoming a senator, Gumau served for two terms in House of Representatives representing the Toro Constituency. He became a Senator by winning 119,489 votes to defeat his closest rival, Ladan Salihu of the Peoples Democratic Party, who received 50,256 votes to win a 2018 by-election due to the death of Senator Malam Wakili.

He is a philanthropist, who has aided in the provision of Jobs and education for youths.

Skill training scandal 
In 2020, Gumau, along with Bauchi North Senator Adamu Muhammad Bulkachuwa, became embroiled in a scandal revolving the quality of skill training constituency projects and the amount of money allocated to the projects. In 2019, Gumau's office received around ₦80 million for "empowerment and training in dry seasonfarming in Tilde, Toro LGA and empowerment of youths in Agricultural practices and development in Bauchi South senatorial district." Like with similar projects run by Bulkachuwa's office in Bauchi North, Gumau's training programs were criticized as substandard and not fitting the amount of money allocated for them. Gumau's programs were supposed to be run by the Federal College of Horticulture, Dadin Kowa; however, the school's Provost refused to accede to a Freedom of Information request on the school's involvement and reporting showed that the programs were actually run by a local NGO, African Unity Foundation. After the training, some of which lasted only a few hours while others were a month-long, participants reported receiving no equipment or funds to continue their new skill and lamented that they had to return to their original occupations after the course. The participants were also party-based as people were chosen based on their (or their family's) connections to local APC leadership.

References

1968 births
Living people
Members of the Senate (Nigeria)
People from Bauchi State
Members of the House of Representatives (Nigeria)